John Joseph Hawkins (1840 – June 2, 1916) was a grocer and political figure in Ontario, Canada. He represented Bothwell in the House of Commons of Canada from 1882 to 1884 as a Liberal-Conservative member.

He was born in Brantford, Upper Canada, the son of John Hawkins and Mary Macdougall, and was educated there. In 1862, Hawkins married Ellen M. Harrington. He served as a member of the first Brantford city council and of the council for Brant County. Hawkins ran unsuccessfully for a seat in the Ontario legislative assembly in 1873 and was an unsuccessful candidate in the 1878 federal election. His election in 1882 was overturned after an appeal and David Mills was declared elected in 1884.

References 
 
The Canadian parliamentary companion, 1891 JA Gemmill

External links 
 The History of the County of Brant, Ontario: Containing a History of the County: Its Township, Cities, Towns, Schools ... (1883) JH Beers pp. 514–5

1840 births
1916 deaths
Members of the House of Commons of Canada from Ontario
Conservative Party of Canada (1867–1942) MPs
Brantford city councillors